The 2019 Scottish Women's Premier League was the 18th season of the SWPL, the highest division of women's football in Scotland since 2002. The league was split into two divisions of eight teams each, SWPL 1 and SWPL 2. The season started on 10 February 2019 and finished on 17 November 2019. The league was known as the Scottish Building Society Scottish Women's Premier League for sponsorship reasons.

Fixtures for the 2019 SWPL 1 season were announced on 17 December 2018, and SWPL 2 fixtures on 21 December 2018.

Glasgow City were the defending champions and retained the Scottish title in 2019, while Heart of Midlothian became champions of SWPL 2 and won promotion to the top flight. In 2019, Motherwell joined SWPL 1 as the promoted club from the 2018 SWPL 2, replacing Hamilton Academical. Dundee United and Partick Thistle joined SWPL 2 as the promoted clubs from the Scottish Women's Football League First Division, replacing Aberdeen and Central Girls. 2019 was the last full season played on a summer calendar in Scottish women's football.

Teams, stadiums, and personnel

Stadiums and locations

SWPL 1

Source: Scottish Women's Premier League

SWPL 2

Source: Scottish Women's Premier League

Personnel

SWPL 1

Source: Scottish Women's Premier League

SWPL 2

Source: Scottish Women's Premier League

SWPL 1

League table

Positions by round

Results

Matches 1 to 14

Matches 15 to 21

SWPL 2

League table

Positions by round

Results

Matches 1 to 14

Matches 15 to 21

Statistics

Scoring

SWPL 1

Source:

SWPL 2

Source:

Hat-tricks

SWPL 1

Notes
4 – Player scored four goals

SWPL 2

Notes
4 – Player scored four goals
6 – Player scored six goals

Awards

Monthly awards

References

External links
 Official website

Scot
Scottish Women's Premier League seasons
Premier League